= Hiram Johnson (Michigan politician) =

American politician (1839–??)

Member of the Michigan House of Representatives from the Shiawassee County 1st district
- In office January 1, 1891 – 1892

Personal details
- Born: September 7, 1839
- Party: Democratic

Hiram Johnson (born September 7, 1839) was an American politician of the Democratic Party who served as a member of the Michigan House of Representatives from 1891 to 1892.

Johnson was elected to the position of state representative on November 4, 1890. Johnson was sworn in on January 7, 1891.
